The Thang Long Warriors is a Vietnamese professional basketball team founded in 2017 and based in Hanoi, Vietnam. They play in the Vietnam Basketball Association.

The Warriors won their first championship at the VBA 2017 and have never missed VBA Playoffs until 2022 when they finished 5-7 and missed the playoffs for first time ever.

Apart from playing pro, the Warriors also takes part in developing Vietnam basketball with their Thang Long Warriors Basketball Academy and their U19, U17 team.

Season-by-season record

Current roster

Head coach 

  Lee Tao Dana (2017)
  Predrag Lukic (2018, 2020-present)
  Matt Juranek (2019)

Uniforms

Social sites

References

 Ngược dòng kịch tính, Thanglong Warriors vô địch VBA
 ThangLong Warriors vô địch giải bóng rổ nhà nghề Việt Nam 2017
 Tracy Thư Lương: Nữ chủ tịch CLB thể thao đầu tiên tại Việt Nam
 Justin Young - chàng cầu thủ từ bỏ gia sản giàu có để chơi bóng rổ: Không có cuộc chơi nào không đánh đổi
 Gặp gỡ hai "hotboy bóng rổ" từ Thang Long Warriors, bạn sẽ hiểu lý do bị "đánh cắp" trái tim!
 Thăng Long Warriors có dàn cầu thủ thượng hạng thế này bảo sao hot girl, sao Việt không phát cuồng
 Dàn cầu thủ Thang Long Warriors hóa "soái ca ngôn tình", đốn tim fan bằng loạt ảnh mặc vest đầy khí chất
 Ấm lòng hành động đẹp của 'fan club Thang Long Warriors' trước trận đại chiến với Cantho Catfish
 Fans xếp hàng dài, kiên nhẫn chờ xin chữ ký của các cầu thủ Thang Long Warriors
Thang Long Warriors continue to be unbeatable at VBA 2018
Thang Long Warriors opens basketball training centre in Hà Nội
Woman storms male basketball club bastion
Tracy Thu Luong: VBA's Wonder Woman

Videos 

 BBUZZ | THANG LONG WARRIORS
 Khoảnh khắc vô địch VBA 2017
 Highlights VBA 2019 || Playoffs 1 - Game 1: Cantho Catfish vs Thang Long Warriors | 24.08
 Highlights VBA 2019 || Game 16: Hanoi Buffaloes vs Thang Long Warriors | 27.06
 Highlights VBA 2019 || Game 37: Thang Long Warriors vs Danang Dragons | 03.08

External links 

Basketball teams established in 2016
Basketball teams in Vietnam
Vietnam Basketball Association teams